The 2011 Biathlon Junior World Championships was held in Nové Město na Moravě, Czech Republic from January 27 to February 5 2011. There was to be a total of 16 competitions: sprint, pursuit, individual, mass start, and relay races for men and women.

Schedule of events

Medal winners

Youth Women

Junior Women

Youth Men

Junior Men

Medal table

References

External links
Official IBU website 

Biathlon Junior World Championships
2011 in biathlon
2011 in Czech sport
International sports competitions hosted by the Czech Republic
2011 in youth sport